Justin Tahapary (born 23 May 1985) is a Dutch former professional footballer who played as a right back. He formerly played for FC Eindhoven and FC Den Bosch.

External links
 Voetbal International profile 

1985 births
Living people
Dutch footballers
Sportspeople from 's-Hertogenbosch
Footballers from North Brabant
FC Eindhoven players
FC Den Bosch players
Eerste Divisie players

Association football fullbacks